Spergula is a genus of flowering plants in the family Caryophyllaceae.  Their usual English name is spurry or spurrey.   Commonly found in grassland, the genus originated in the northern hemisphere, but is now found worldwide.

Species
Species include:
Spergula arvensis L. – corn spurry
Spergula calva Pedersen
Spergula depauperata Pedersen
Spergula fallax (Lowe) E.H.L.Krause
Spergula grandis Pers.
Spergula levis (Cambess.) D. Dietr.
Spergula maritima Pedersen
Spergula morisonii Boreau – Morison's spurry
Spergula pentandra L.
Spergula platensis (Cambess.) Shinners
Spergula ramosa (Cambess.) D. Dietr.
Spergula rubra J. Presl & C. Presl
Spergula viscosa Lag.

See also
Similar genera that have been taxonomically intertwined with Spergula:
Arenaria
Spergularia

References

Caryophyllaceae
Caryophyllaceae genera